Mariano da Costa Vidal (born 20 February 1995), commonly known as Jó, is an Angolan footballer who currently plays as a defender for Primeiro de Agosto in the Angolan league, the Girabola.

In 2018-19, he joined Progresso do Sambizanga in Angola's first league division.

In 2019-20, he signed in for Primeiro de Agosto.

Career statistics

Club

Notes

International

References

1995 births
Living people
Angolan footballers
Angola international footballers
Association football defenders
C.D. Primeiro de Agosto players
G.D. Interclube players
Progresso Associação do Sambizanga players
Girabola players